Geoffrey Kipkorir Kirui (Born 16 February 1993) is a Kenyan long-distance runner who competes in cross country running competitions, track and road races up to the marathon.

Junior career
Kirui won gold in the 10,000 metres at the 2011 African Junior Athletics Championships.

He won bronze in the men's 10,000 metres at the 2012 World Junior Championships in Athletics.

Senior career
At the 2013 IAAF World Cross Country Championships, he finished 15th in the senior men's race.

Kirui won the 2017 Boston Marathon in 2 hours, 9 minutes, and 37 seconds.  It was his third marathon.

Kirui participated in the 2017 World Championships held in London, winning the gold in the Marathon, with a time of 2:08:27. 

In 2019, he competed in the men's marathon at the 2019 World Athletics Championships held in Doha, Qatar. He finished in 14th place.

In 2020 Geoffrey competed at the Valencia Marathon, however he DNF in a race won by Kenya's Evans Chebet in 2:03:00.

Personal bests

Marathons
2016 Rotterdam Marathon 2:07:23 (3rd)
2016 Amsterdam Marathon 2:06:27 (7th)
2017 Boston Marathon 2:09:37 (1st)
2017 World Championships in Athletics 2:08:27 (1st)
2018 Boston Marathon 2:18:23 (2nd)
2018 Chicago Marathon 2:06:45 (6th)
2019 Boston Marathon 2:08:55 (5th)
2019 World Athletics Championships 2:13:54 (14th)

References

External links

Living people
1993 births
Kenyan male long-distance runners
Kenyan male marathon runners
Boston Marathon male winners
Kenyan male cross country runners
World Athletics Championships medalists
World Athletics Championships athletes for Kenya
World Athletics Championships winners
People from Nyeri County
21st-century Kenyan people